Magoula is a village and a community of the Elassona municipality. Before the 2011 local government reform it was a part of the municipality of Potamia, of which it was a municipal district. The 2011 census recorded 232 inhabitants in the village. The community of Magoula covers an area of 7.803 km2.

Economy
The population of Magoula is occupied in animal husbandry and agriculture (mainly tobacco).

Population
According to the 2011 census, the population of the settlement of Magoula was 232 people, a decrease of almost 33% compared with the population of the previous census of 2001.

See also
 List of settlements in the Larissa regional unit

References

Populated places in Larissa (regional unit)